One Brief Summer is a 1970 British drama film directed by John Mackenzie. It stars Felicity Gibson and Clifford Evans. It was made at Twickenham Studios.

Cast
 Felicity Gibson as Susan Long
 Clifford Evans as Mark Stevens
 Jennifer Hilary as Jennifer
 Peter Egan as Bill Denton
 Jan Holden as Elizabeth
 Fanny Carby as Mrs. Shaw  
 Richard Vernon as Hayward  
 Helen Lindsay as Mrs. Hayward  
 Basil Moss as John Robertson  
 David Leland as Peter  
 Brian Wilde as Lambert
 Lockwood West as Ebert
 Carolyn Seymour as Mark's Secretary

References

External links

1970 films
Films directed by John Mackenzie (film director)
British drama films
1970 drama films
1970s English-language films
1970s British films